Miikka Anttila (born 10 September 1972) is a Finnish rally co-driver, currently teaming with Jari-Matti Latvala at Toyota Gazoo Racing WRT. Anttila has previously served alongside such drivers as Mikko Hirvonen, Janne Tuohino and Kosti Katajamäki.

Career
Debuting in the World Rally Championship in 1999, Anttila began co-driving Latvala at the 2003 Rallye Deutschland and got his first win at the 2008 Swedish Rally. He missed the birth of his second child to participate in the Rally de Espana in 2011.

He joined Volkswagen Motorsport after its formation as a manufacturer team in 2013.

For 2017, Anttila is racing for the works Toyota team.

At the 2018 Tour de Corse, Anttila made his 197th WRC start which made him the most experienced competitor in the history of the sport. The record was previously held by Spanish driver and two times world-champion Carlos Sainz who started 196 events. He became the first-ever competitor to start 200 rallies in the WRC at the 2018 Rally d'Italia.

Until 2019 Anttila was paired up with Jari-Matti Latvala racing for Toyota.

In 2020, he started co-driving Eerik Pietarinen.

Rally victories

WRC victories
{|class="wikitable"
!  # 
! Event
! Season
! Driver
! Car
|-
| 1
|  Swedish Rally
| 2008
|  Jari-Matti Latvala
| Ford Focus RS WRC 07
|-
| 2
|  Rally d'Italia Sardegna
| 2009
|  Jari-Matti Latvala
| Ford Focus RS WRC 09
|-
| 3
|  Rally New Zealand
| 2010
|  Jari-Matti Latvala
| Ford Focus RS WRC 09
|-
| 4
|  Rally Finland
| 2010
|  Jari-Matti Latvala
| Ford Focus RS WRC 09
|-
| 5
|  Wales Rally GB
| 2011
|  Jari-Matti Latvala
| Ford Fiesta RS WRC
|-
| 6
|  Rally Sweden
| 2012
|  Jari-Matti Latvala
| Ford Fiesta RS WRC
|-
| 7
|  Wales Rally GB
| 2012
|  Jari-Matti Latvala
| Ford Fiesta RS WRC
|-
| 8
|  Acropolis Rally
| 2013
|  Jari-Matti Latvala
| Volkswagen Polo R WRC
|-
|9
|  Rally Sweden
| 2014
|  Jari-Matti Latvala
| Volkswagen Polo R WRC
|-
|10
|  Rally Argentina
| 2014
|  Jari-Matti Latvala
| Volkswagen Polo R WRC
|-
|11
|  Rally Finland
| 2014
|  Jari-Matti Latvala
| Volkswagen Polo R WRC
|-
| 12
|  Rallye de France Alsace
| 2014
|  Jari-Matti Latvala
| Volkswagen Polo R WRC
|-
| 13
|  Rally de Portugal
| 2015
|  Jari-Matti Latvala
| Volkswagen Polo R WRC
|-
|14
|  Rally Finland
| 2015
|  Jari-Matti Latvala
| Volkswagen Polo R WRC
|-
|15
|  Tour de Corse
| 2015
|  Jari-Matti Latvala
| Volkswagen Polo R WRC
|-
|16
|  Rally Mexico
| 2016
|  Jari-Matti Latvala
| Volkswagen Polo R WRC
|-
|17
|  Rally Sweden
| 2017
|  Jari-Matti Latvala
| Toyota Yaris WRC
|-
|18
|  Rally Australia
| 2018
|  Jari-Matti Latvala
| Toyota Yaris WRC
|-
|}

Rally results

WRC results

References

External links

 Profile at ewrc-results.com

1972 births
Living people
Finnish rally co-drivers
World Rally Championship co-drivers
People from Janakkala
Sportspeople from Kanta-Häme